The All India Majlis-E-Ittehadul Muslimeen ( AIMIM) is an Indian political party based primarily in the old city of Hyderabad. It is also a significant political party in the Indian States of Telangana and Maharashtra.  It is the second largest party in Telangana Legislative Assembly and in Telangana Legislative Council. Its aim is to promote the social, economical, and educational development and effective representation of Indian Muslims and Dalits.

AIMIM has held the Lok Sabha seat for the Hyderabad constituency since 1984. In the 2014 Telangana Legislative Assembly elections, the party won seven seats and received recognition as a 'state party' by the Election Commission of India.

For much of its existence, it had little presence beyond old Hyderabad. However, in more recent years, it has begun expanding into other states. It now has a significant presence in Maharashtra, with Imtiyaz Jaleel winning the Aurangabad constituency and with multiple members elected to the Legislative Assembly. It has also made inroads in Bihar, winning five Legislative Assembly seats in 2020.

Origins
The party has roots back to the days of the princely State of Hyderabad. It was founded and shaped by Nawab Mahmood Nawaz Khan Qiledar of Hyderabad State in the presence of Ulma-e-Mashaeqeen in 1927 as a pro-Nizam party. Then it was only Majlis-e-Ittehadul Muslimeen (MIM) and the first meeting was held in the house of Nawab Mahmood Nawaz Khan on 12 November 1927. The MIM shunned integration with India and instead, advocated to set up "Muslim dominion" in India. In 1938, Bahadur Yar Jung was elected president of the MIM which had a cultural and religious manifesto. It soon acquired political complexion and after the death of Bahadur Yar Jang in 1944, Qasim Rizvi was elected as the leader.

The Razakars, led by Kasim Razvi, were an Islamist paramilitary organization of self-styled volunteers formed, ostensibly, to resist merger with India. Razvi and MIM wanted a Muslim country to be carved out of Hyderabad as South Pakistan. The  Razakars operated as "storm troopers" for the MIM. The 150,000 Razakar "soldiers", mobilized to "fight against the Indian Union" for the independence of Hyderabad State. After the Indian annexation of Hyderabad State, the MIM was banned in 1948. Qasim Rizvi was jailed from 1948 to 1957, and was released on the condition that he would go to Pakistan where he was granted an asylum.

Before leaving, Razvi handed over the responsibility of whatever remained of the MIM to Abdul Wahed Owaisi, a lawyer. Owaisi organised it into the All India Majlis-e-Ittehadul Muslimeen. Under his leadership, the AIMIM shifted from a hardline policy of independence to a pragmatic direction. After Abdul Wahed Owaisi, his son Sultan Salahuddin Owaisi took control of AIMIM in 1975 and was referred to as Salar E Millat (commander of  the community).

In Indian politics

Andhra Pradesh/Telangana

In 1960, AIMIM won the Mallepally ward of Hyderabad Municipal Corporation. In 1962, Salahuddin won from Patharghatti assembly seat as an independent candidate and later from Charminar constituency in 1967. In 1972, he won from Yakutpura and later in 1978, again from Charminar. In 1984 Salahuddin emerged victorious in the central seat of Hyderabad, which he represented the seat until 2004. Mohammad Majid Hussain of the AIMIM was unanimously elected as the Mayor of Greater Hyderabad on 2 January 2012.

In 1993, AIMIM suffered a split, with a faction led by Amanullah Khan creating the Majlis Bachao Tehreek. As a result, AIMIM was reduced to a single Assembly seat in Andhra Pradesh in 1994. They won 4 seats in 1999, and increased their total to 7 in 2009, where they have remained since then. They joined the Congress-led United Progressive Alliance in 2008, but left it in 2012.
AIMIM have 7 MLAs , 2 MLCs , 1 MP , 67 Municipal Corporators & 70 Councillors in Telangana.

Maharastra

The party won 2 seats at the 2014 Maharashtra Legislative Assembly election.

In 2018, AIMIM allied with Prakash Ambedkar's Vanchit Bahujan Aghadi. AIMIM and VBA contested the 2019 Lok Sabha elections in Maharashtra in alliance. Imtiyaz Jaleel won the Aurangabad seat, winning a seat for AIMIM outside Hyderabad for the first time ever. Owaisi's AIMIM big scores in Maharashtra Municipal Corporation Election. The Party won 25 seats in Aurangabad, 10 in Amravati, 9 in Solapur, 7 in Malegaon, 4 in Dhule, 2 in Mumbai, 2 in Thane , 2 in Kalyan and 1 in Pune. The AIMIM Party won Total 62 Municipal corporators , 40 Municipal Councilors , 102 Grampanchayat member & 1 Zilla Parishad member in Maharashtra.

Bihar

Former RJD and JD(U) leader and Kochadhaman MLA Akhtarul Iman joined AIMIM in 2015, he was made state president of the party in Bihar. Akhtarul Iman contested 2015 Bihar Assembly Elections from Kochadhaman seat on AIMIM ticket against seating JD(U) MLA and Mahagathbandhan Candidate Mujahid Alam. Iman's popularity in his home constituency could not win him election in 2015 due to strong favour of Muslims voters towards Mahagathbandhan candidates.  State President Akhtarul Iman contested from Kishanganj Lok Sabha on AIMIM ticket in the 2019 Indian general election,. In triangular contest among Akhtarul Iman, Congress candidate Dr. Jawaid Azad and JD(U) candidate Mahmood Ashraf, Dr. Jawaid Azad won the elections with a comfortable margin and Akhtarul Iman was at third position.

Later that year, Qamrul Hoda won the bye election from Kishanganj Assembly Constituency on AIMIM ticket defeating Congress candidate Dr. Jawaid Azad's mother. The seat was left vacant after Dr. Jawaid Azad's victory in the Lok Sabha election. Qamrul Huda is the first elected MLA of AIMIM in Bihar. He lost his seat in 2020 Assembly Elections.

AIMIM contested the 2020 Bihar Legislative Assembly election as part of the Grand Democratic Secular Front. The party won 5 seats in the Seemanchal region, with Iman winning from Amour, Ruknuddin Ahmed from Baisi, Izhar Asfi from Kochdhaman, Anzar Nayeemi from Bahadurganj and Shahnawaz Alam from Jokihat.

Party Division In Bihar 
On 29 June 2022, four out of five AIMIM MLAs joined RJD in the presence of Lalu Prasad Yadav leaving behind Amour MLA Akhtarul Iman lone party MLA in Bihar.

In an exclusive interview with Main Media after party breakup, Akhtarul Iman blamed Jokihat MLA for their action. He also claimed that every MLA was given huge sum of money in exchange for joining RJD.

Uttar Pradesh
AIMIM win 32 seats in Uttar Pradesh Local body election in 2017. AIMIM contested on 100 seats in  2022 Uttar Pradesh Legislative Assembly election but failed miserably. AIMIM lost election on all seats.

</ref>

In many such constituencies, they have indirectly split the secular votes and made BJP win , hence been termed as "BJP Agent" by many opposition leaders.

Gujarat 

AIMIM made impressive debut in Amdavad Municipal Corporation. They contested 21 seats and won 7. AIMIM panel won all seats in Jamalpur and Maktampura Wards. All 7 seats AIMIM won came at the cost of Congress, these seats belonged to Congress in 2015. After few days AIMIM likely contest to Gujarat Municipality election & he succeeded. Party won 9 seats in Modasa  , 8 in Godhra & 2 seats in Bharuch. Later AIMIM won Bharuch municipality ward no 10 bye election by 1400 votes.

Karnataka 
AIMIM won 4 Corporators seats in Karnataka Municipal Corporation. 3 in Hubli & 1 in Belgavi. In City Council election AIMIM won 4 Councillors in Bidar (2) & Kolar (2) Municipality.

Tamil Nadu 
AIMIM opened its account in Tamil Nadu by winning 2 seats of the 16 wards it contested in Vaniyambadi municipal elections 2022. Tamil Nadu is the fourth state in south India after Telangana, Andhra Pradesh and Karnataka to have its representation in municipal bodies.

Electoral performance

General elections

State Assembly Elections

Leadership

Headquarters
The main party office is located within Darussalam, where Deccan College of Engineering and Technology, Deccan School of Pharmacy, Deccan School of Planning and Architecture, and Deccan School of Management are also located. The Etemaad Press Office is also situated adjacent to the engineering college. The open grounds on the campus are also used from time to time to organize political gatherings (termed as "jalsa") where the party leaders deliver speeches to public and media alike.

List of National Presidents
 Bahadur Yar Jung Also one of the 96 Founding Father's of Pakistan  - (1927-1944)
 Qasim Razvi - ( 1944-1957)
 Abdul Wahed Owaisi - (1958 to 1983) Founder President
 Sultan Salahuddin Owaisi - (1983 to 2008) 
 Asaduddin Owaisi - (2008 to Till date)

Non-Muslim candidates
AIMIM has occasionally fielded Hindus in various assembly and local body elections. The AIMIM selected Alampally Pochiah as its First Mayor in the City. MIM had three Hindu Hyderabad mayors- K. Prakash Rao, A. Satyanarayana and Alampalli Pochaiah. A Muralidhar Reddy, Hindu candidate being fielded for an assembly seat by Majlis-e-Ittehadul Muslimeen from Rajendranagar constituency.

In 2013 local elections the party fielded a woman candidate from Hindu OBC, V.Bhanumathi, who won election against Hajira Sultana from Congress by 1,282 votes.

Aurangabad Municipal Corporation AIMIM fielded 12 non-Muslim candidates, mostly underprivileged Hindus referred to as Dalits. Of these 12, five non-Muslims — Sangeeta Waghule, Lata Nikhalge, Gangadhar Dhage, Sarita Borde and Vikas Edke won.

AIMIM has announced 19 Hindus candidates in various assembly seats in 2022 Uttar Pradesh Legislative Assembly election, with Pandit Manmohan Jha Gama being the first one.

Controversies
Multiple members of the party have been accused of inciting violence, fear mongering and hate speech.
In 2007, the floor leader of the party in the Telangana Assembly, Akbaruddin Owaisi, threatened to kill the writer Taslima Nasreen should she ever visit Hyderabad again. Nasreen was later attacked during a book launch for the Telugu translation of her novel Shodh.

In February 2020, Police from India's Kalaburagi, Karnataka region charged party leader Waris Pathan for alleged hate speech. In the speech Pathon allegedly expressed Anti-Hindu sentiment by positing, "To those saying we have only put our women at the forefront of the protest against the CAA, NRC and NPR, only our lionesses have come out till now and you are already sweating. Imagine what will happen if we all men came together. We are 15 crore, which can outweigh their 100 crore". Waris later apologised for the comments via Twitter while the party's president Asaduddin Owaisi advised him not to make provocative remarks in public.

Philanthropy
AIMIM donated relief worth  78.75 lakh for Uttarakhand flood victims in 2013.

AIMIM donated over  5 crores aid to the 2017 Bihar flood victims in August 2017.

During the 2018 floods in Kerala, AIMIM donated 16 Lakh rupees and 10 Lakh rupees worth medicines.

During the 2020 Delhi riots, AIMIM organized two medical relief camps in Delhi and donated medicines worth  40 Lakhs. Asaduddin Owaisi announced that all elected representatives of AIMIM will donate one month of their salary for those affected by the Delhi riots.

See also 
 Politics of India

Notes

References

External links 
 

 
Political parties in Telangana
Political parties established in 1927
Islamic political parties in India
1927 establishments in India
Politics of Hyderabad, India